The Roman Catholic Diocese of Zé Doca is a diocese located in the city of Zé Doca in the Ecclesiastical province of São Luís do Maranhão in Brazil. Until 1985, it was known as the Diocese of Cândido Mendes.

History
 16 October 1961: Established as Territorial Prelature of Cândido Mendes from the Territorial Prelature of Pinheiro
 13 October 1983: Promoted as Diocese of Cândido Mendes
 5 July 1991: Renamed as Diocese of Zé Doca

Bishops
 Bishops of Zé Doca (Roman rite), below
 Bishop Jan Kot (2014.07.23-present)
 Bishop Carlo Ellena (2004.02.18 – 2014.07.23)
 Bishop Walmir Alberto Valle, I.M.C. (1985.11.05 – 2002.11.06), diocese renamed 1991.07.05; appointed Coadjutor Bishop of Joaçaba, Santa Catarina
 Bishop of Cândido Mendes (Roman Rite), below
 Bishop Guido Maria Casullo (1983.10.13 – 1985.11.05)
 Prelate of Cândido Mendes (Roman Rite), below
 Bishop Guido Maria Casullo (1965.12.20 – 1983.10.13)

References
 Giga-Catholic Information
 Catholic Hierarchy

Roman Catholic dioceses in Brazil
Christian organizations established in 1961
Ze Doca, Roman Catholic Diocese of
Roman Catholic dioceses and prelatures established in the 20th century
1961 establishments in Brazil